"Hot Water & Milk" (also known as Hot Water and Milk) is a song by Australian alternative rock band, Spiderbait and was released in December 1996 as the second single from the band's third studio album Ivy and the Big Apples. It peaked at number 78 on the Australian chart.

Track listings

Charts

Release history

References

 

1996 singles
1996 songs
Spiderbait songs
Polydor Records singles